Amietia vandijki, also known as Van Dijk's river frog, is a species of frog in the family Pyxicephalidae. It is endemic to South Africa.  The name commemorates Eddie Van Dijk, a South African herpetologist.

Its natural habitats are temperate forest, Mediterranean-type shrubby vegetation, and rivers. It is threatened by habitat loss.

References

Visser, J. and A. Channing. (1997). A new species of river frog from the Swartberg, South Africa (Ranidae: Afrana). Journal of African Zoology 111: 191–198.

vandijki
Amphibians described in 1997
Endemic amphibians of South Africa
Taxonomy articles created by Polbot